State Route 186 (SR 186) is a highway in Cochise County, Arizona that runs from its junction with Interstate 10 in Willcox to its junction with SR 181 west of the Chiricahua National Monument.  It is a northwest–southeast diagonal route.

Route description
The western terminus of SR 186 is located at Virginia Avenue, west of an interchange with I-10, in Willcox. It heads east beyond I-10 along Rex Allen Drive to an intersection with the I-10 Business Loop. SR 186 heads southwest from this intersection concurrent with I-10 Bus. until it reaches Maley Street. At this intersection, SR 186 follows Maley St. to the southeast as I-10 Bus. continues to the southwest. SR 186 heads southeast from Willcox until it curves towards the east at an intersection with Kansas Settlement Road. The highway continues on this heading until it curves towards the south after passing through Dos Cabezas. The highway curves back towards the southeast until it curves back towards the south near its eastern terminus.  The eastern terminus of SR 186 is located at ain intersection with SR 181 west of the Chiricahua National Monument.

Aside from its endpoint in Willcox, SR 186 passes through only sparsely populated terrain, and there are no other cities or towns along the route.  It serves primarily as an access road for the monument, providing a more convenient route for travelers coming from the north.

History
The route was added the Arizona's state highway system in 1955, when a county road was given rights to the Arizona Department of Transportation. The highway was paved from Willcox southeast for approximately four miles in 1960 before being moved a year later. The highway was then re-extended into the city of Willcox in 1968 and formally established as a state highway in 1970, when the definition of a state highway was refined in 1970. Since then, there have been no routing changes on SR 186.

Junction list

References

186
Transportation in Cochise County, Arizona